The RAK Gateway is a planned community in Ras Al Khaimah, the United Arab Emirates. It is planned to be sustainable along the same lines as the proposed Masdar City in Abu Dhabi.

External links
 RAK Gateway, UAE

Planned cities
Planned cities in the United Arab Emirates
Populated places in the Emirate of Ras Al Khaimah